Tara Gins (born 2 December 1990) is a Belgian racing cyclist, who currently rides for Belgian amateur team Get Coached.

See also
 List of 2016 UCI Women's Teams and riders

References

External links

1990 births
Living people
Belgian female cyclists
Place of birth missing (living people)
21st-century Belgian women